A donor in general is a person, organization or government which donates something voluntarily. The term is usually used to represent a form of pure altruism, but is sometimes used when the payment for a service is recognized by all parties as representing less than the value of the donation and that the motivation is altruistic. In business law a donor is someone who is giving the gift (law), and a donee the person receiving the gift.

More broadly, the term is used to refer to any entity that serves as the source of something transferred to a different entity, including - in scientific fields - the source of matter or energy passed from one object to another.

The Online Etymology Dictionary traces the English-language word "donor" back to the mid-15th century, with origins in Anglo-French, Old French, Latin and Proto-Indo-European.

In science
Often the word is used as a shorter term for:
 Blood donor
 Donor (semiconductors)
 Egg donor
 Electron donor — (by analogy) a technical term in chemistry and semiconductor physics (see also the next entry)
 Organ donor
 Sperm donor

In society and international relations 
 Benefactor (law)
 Donor government or donor organisation in official development assistance
 Grant (law)
 Patronage

In art 

Donor portrait, portrait of the person who paid for a painting, typically in a church

In literature 
In fairy tales, a donor is a stock character that tests the hero (and sometimes other characters as well) and provides magical assistance to the hero when he succeeds.

See also 
 Sponsor (commercial)

References